Once Upon a Mouse is a 1981 American theatrical featurette directed by Jerry Kramer and Gary Rocklen of Kramer/Rocklen Studios, produced in association with Walt Disney Productions. It was released on July 10, 1981 on a double bill with The Fox and the Hound.

Dedication

Plot
A documentary featurette produced in celebration of the studio's 20th (soon to be 24th) feature-length animated film The Fox and the Hound which highlights sixty years of Walt Disney's legacy beginning with Steamboat Willie in 1928 followed by a kaleidoscopic magic carpet ride through the world of Disney animation, including segments from hundreds of films shown through the use of montages, collages, computerized optical effects, behind-the-scenes footage, and special tributes to Disney and Mickey Mouse.

The featured clips include Mickey Mouse shorts, The Jungle Book, Bambi, Fantasia, The Rescuers, Song of the South, One Hundred and One Dalmatians, Snow White and the Seven Dwarfs, The Adventures of Ichabod and Mr. Toad, Alice in Wonderland, Lady and the Tramp, Pinocchio, Dumbo, Peter Pan, Sleeping Beauty, The Aristocats, The Sword in the Stone and Robin Hood.Once Upon a Mouse began airing on The Disney Channel in the mid-1980s and would be shown again in reruns, the last time being in 2002 as part of the Vault Disney block of programming.

Cast
Walt Disney as Himself / Mickey Mouse (archive footage)
Clarence Nash as Donald Duck (archive footage)
Aurora Miranda as Herself
Betty Lou Gerson as Cruella De Vil
Hans Conried as Slave in the Magic Mirror (archive footage)/Captain Hook
Jim Jordan as Orville
Bob Newhart as Bernard
Evelyn Venable as the Blue Fairy
Dickie Jones as Pinocchio
Adriana Caselotti as Snow White
Harry Stockwell as Prince Charming
Lucille La Verne as Queen Grimhilde
Verna Felton as the Queen of Hearts/Flora
Barbara Luddy as Lady
Bobby Driscoll as Peter Pan
Kathryn Beaumont as Alice
Christian Rub as Geppetto
Ilene Woods as Cinderella
Eleanor Audley as Maleficent
Edward Brophy as Timothy Q. Mouse
Phil Harris as Thomas O'Malley
Peter Behn as Young Thumper
Frankie Darro as Lampwick
Cliff Edwards as Jiminy Cricket (archive footage)

Home media
The short was released in Japan on August 25, 1986 on VHS and LaserDisc as part of a compilation of Disney shorts called Once Upon a Mouse and Other Mousetime Stories. This compilation also features The Flying Mouse (1934), Three Blind Mouseketeers (1936), Brave Little Tailor (1938) and Ben and Me'' (1953).

See also
List of American films of 1981
List of Disney live-action shorts
List of Walt Disney Pictures films

References

External links

Once Upon a Mouse on YouTube
Once Upon a Mouse on Dailymotion

1981 films
1981 short films
1981 documentary films
1980s Disney animated short films
American short documentary films
1980s short documentary films
Disney documentary films
Documentary films about animation
Films about Disney
Collage film
Compilation films
Works about Walt Disney
Walt Disney Pictures films
Mickey Mouse films
1980s English-language films